The Railroad Builder is a 1911 American silent short drama film. The film starred William Garwood, Marguerite Snow and William Russell.

References

External links

1911 drama films
1911 films
Thanhouser Company films
Silent American drama films
American silent short films
American black-and-white films
1911 short films
1910s American films